Simon Anthony Black (born 9 November 1975) is an English former professional footballer who played as a forward in the Football League for Birmingham City.

Black was born in Marston Green, Solihull. When he left school in 1991, he joined Birmingham City as a YTS trainee, and made his debut in Division One (second tier) on the opening day of the 1993–94 season in a 1–0 defeat at Charlton Athletic. He played once more in the league and twice in the Anglo-Italian Cup, before leaving the club. He was later on the books of Doncaster Rovers, without playing for the first team.

He joined Yeovil Town, making his debut for them on 4 March and going on to make 13 appearances during the remainder of the 1994–95 season and score four goals. He subsequently played one match for Ilkeston Town on 24 February 1996 before joining Gloucester City, where he scored three goals in seven appearances by the end of the 1995–96 season.

In early 1998 he signed for Brierley Hill Town, but joined Halesowen Town later in the year. He subsequently played for Bedworth United in 1999, Stourbridge from 2000 to 2001, Paget Rangers in 2002, Bridlington Town and Hall Road Rangers.

References

1975 births
Living people
People from Marston Green
English footballers
Association football forwards
Birmingham City F.C. players
Doncaster Rovers F.C. players
Yeovil Town F.C. players
Ilkeston Town F.C. (1945) players
Gloucester City A.F.C. players
Brierley Hill & Withymoor F.C. players
Halesowen Town F.C. players
Bedworth United F.C. players
Stourbridge F.C. players
Paget Rangers F.C. players
Bridlington Town A.F.C. players
Hall Road Rangers F.C. players
English Football League players
Southern Football League players